William St Clair of Roslin, 20th Baron of Roslin (1700-1778) was a member of the Clan Sinclair. His title, Baron of Roslin, was not a peerage but a Scottish feudal barony. He had an interest in sport and was a skilled golfer and archer. He redesigned the Old Course at St. Andrews to 18 holes thus affecting all golf courses since. He was the son of Alexander St Clair, 19th Baron of Roslin.

Freemasonry
He was a Scottish Freemason, being Initiated in Lodge Canongate Kilwinning on 18 May, Passed on 2 June 1736 and Raised on 3 November 1736. He is known as the first Grand Master (although his actual title is Grand Master Mason) of the Grand Lodge of Scotland. He became the first Grand Master Mason by acclamation on St. Andrew's Day of the same year (1736).

See also

Lord Sinclair
Earl of Caithness
Lord Herdmanston

References

Sources

 

1778 deaths
Scottish Freemasons
Grand Lodge of Scotland
18th-century Scottish people
William
Place of birth missing
1700 births